Karl Kubik was an Austrian footballer who played as a midfielder for DFC Prag in the inaugural German football championship in 1903. He went on to play for Vienna Cricket and Football Club and Sportbrüder Prag, and also represented the Austrian national team on two occasions in 1908.

References

External links
 
 

Year of birth missing
Year of death missing
Austrian footballers
Austria international footballers
Association football midfielders
DFC Prag players